Pulegone is a naturally occurring organic compound obtained from the essential oils of a variety of plants such as Nepeta cataria (catnip), Mentha piperita, and pennyroyal. It is classified as a monoterpene.

Pulegone is a clear colorless oily liquid and has a pleasant odor similar to pennyroyal, peppermint and camphor.  It is used in flavoring agents, in perfumery, and in aromatherapy.

Toxicology
It was reported that the chemical is toxic to rats if a large quantity is consumed.

Pulegone is also an insecticide − the most powerful of three insecticides naturally occurring in many mint species.

As of October 2018, the FDA withdrew authorization for the use of pulegone as a synthetic flavoring substance for use in food, but that naturally-occurring pulegone can continue to be used.

Sources
 Creeping charlie
 Mentha longifolia
 Mentha suaveolens
 Pennyroyal
 Peppermint
 Schizonepeta tenuifolia
Bursera graveolens

See also 
 Menthofuran
 Menthol

References 

Ketones
Flavors
Cooling flavors
Perfume ingredients
Monoterpenes
IARC Group 2B carcinogens